Raiding is a small Austrian market town in the district of Oberpullendorf in Burgenland. It is the birthplace of Franz Liszt.

Geography 
The municipality lies on Raiding Creek in Middle Burgenland; Raiding is the only borough in the municipality.

History 
Raiding was first documented in 1425 as Dobornya.

Like the rest of Burgenland, Raiding belonged to Hungary from c. 900 to 1920/21. After the end of the First World War, Western Hungary was given to Austria with the Treaties of St. Germain and Trianon; there it formed the new province of Burgenland.

In 1971, Raiding was merged with Unterfrauenhaid and Lackendorf into a larger municipality, which was later dissolved. Raiding has been a market town since 1990.

Population

Politics 
The municipal council has 15 seats with party mandates as follows: SPÖ 9, ÖVP 6, FPÖ 0, Grüne 0, and other lists 0.

Culture and landmarks 
 Franz Liszt's birthplace

Business and infrastructure 
Viticulture is the main business in Raiding. Other industries there include metal construction and soda water production.

Personalities 
 Paul Iby, Bishop of Eisenstadt
 Adam Liszt ∞ Anna Liszt
 Franz Liszt, composer and musician

Image gallery

References

Cities and towns in Oberpullendorf District